Musafir is a 2016 Bangladeshi action-thriller film written and directed by Ashiqur Rahman. The film stars Arifin Shuvoo, Marjan Jenifa, Misha Sawdagor, Tiger Robi, Elias Kobra, Shohel Mondol, Rebeka Rouf, Anondo Khaled, Afzal Sharif, Shimul Khan, Jadu Azad and Cindy Rolling. Shuvoo plays an intelligence double agent, and a trained assassin of Secret Service Bangladesh (SSB) who is placed as a mole in target organization. The plot builds up around SSB's rescue operation of Zara, who has possession of many classified information wanted by Bangladesh's external enemies. Jenifa plays the role of Zara Mehjabin, a surveillance agent of SSB, suddenly disappeared with many classified documents of the agency. The plot takes an interesting turn when the target agency sends Shuvo to abduct Zara, not knowing that he is actually a SSB agent in disguise.

The film is produced by Jobaer Alam under the banner of Perceptual Pictures and distributed by Tiger Media Limited. Musafir is the second collaboration between Ashiqur Rahman and Arifin Shuvoo after initial success of 2014 action film Kistimaat. The film was released on 22 April 2016 and received overwhelming response at box office and from audiences.

Plot summary
The story revolves around a secret agent from the Secret Service Bangladesh SSB, Marjaan who went missing with classified information that can put national security at risk. Sunny Arifin Shuvoo, a contract killer whose mission is to find Zara Mehjabin Marjan Jenifa. The powerful underworld mafia are also looking to get their hands on the classified information. In a race between the Secret Service Bangladesh and the underworld mafia, who will get to the information first? and that is how the story moves on.

Cast

Production

Development
After the success of Kistimaat, Ashiqur Rahman announced his next project in January 2015. After much discussion, Arifin Shuvoo was selected for the lead role. Since then, Misha Sawdagor and Tiger Robi were approached to play the antagonists in the film. Director Ashiqur Rahman later announced that he would introduce a new female lead in the film and Marjan Jenifa was selected for the role. It was later reported that Prosun Azad would also play a supporting role.
According to the producers, the film's action sequences were to be shot and directed with international experts. Edward Mithu was hired from Singapore as the fight director.

Shooting
The film's principal photography began in February 2015 and official shooting began on 20 March 2015. The first few scenes were shot at Hatirjheel, Dhaka and several other scenes were shot in other locations of the city. The film was also shot in Chittagong and Sylhet.

Promotion
The film's promotional first look was released on 9 May 2015 and the first teaser trailer was released on 15 May 2015.

Music

Soundtrack album

References

2016 films
2010s action comedy-drama films
2016 romantic comedy-drama films
Bengali-language Bangladeshi films
Bangladeshi romantic comedy-drama films
Films scored by Belal Khan
Bangladeshi action comedy-drama films
Films scored by Imran Mahmudul
2010s Bengali-language films
2016 comedy films
2016 drama films